The 2017–18 Magyar Kupa, known as  for sponsorship reasons, was the 60th edition of the tournament.

Schedule
The rounds of the 2017–18 competition are scheduled as follows:

Matches 
A total of 46 matches will take place, starting with Pre-qualifying on 1 September 2017 and culminating with the Final on 15 April 2018 at the Főnix Hall in Debrecen.

Pre-qualifying
The pre-qualifying round ties are scheduled for 1–8 September 2017.

|-
!colspan="3" style="background:#ccccff;"| 1 September

|-
!colspan="3" style="background:#ccccff;"| 5 September

|-
!colspan="3" style="background:#ccccff;"| 8 September

|}

Round I
The first round ties are scheduled for 6–20 September 2017.

|-
!colspan="3" style="background:#ccccff;"| 6 September

|-
!colspan="3" style="background:#ccccff;"| 8 September

|-
!colspan="3" style="background:#ccccff;"| 19 September

|-
!colspan="3" style="background:#ccccff;"| 20 September

|}

Round II
The second round ties are scheduled for 2–18 October 2017.

|-
!colspan="3" style="background:#ccccff;"| 2 October

|-
!colspan="3" style="background:#ccccff;"| 10 October

|-
!colspan="3" style="background:#ccccff;"| 17 October

|-
!colspan="3" style="background:#ccccff;"| 20 October

|}

Round III
The third round ties are scheduled for 7–22 November 2017.

|-
!colspan="4" style="background:#ccccff;"| 7 November

|-
!colspan="3" style="background:#ccccff;"| 8 November

|-
!colspan="3" style="background:#ccccff;"| 14 November

|-
!colspan="3" style="background:#ccccff;"| 22 November

|}

Round IV
The fourth round ties are scheduled for 12 December 2017 – 13 February 2018.

|-
!colspan="3" style="background:#ccccff;"| 12 December

|-
!colspan="3" style="background:#ccccff;"| 13 December

|-
!colspan="3" style="background:#ccccff;"| 31 January

|-
!colspan="3" style="background:#ccccff;"| 13 February

|}

Round V
The fifth round ties are scheduled for 2–6 March 2018.

|-
!colspan="3" style="background:#ccccff;"| 2 March

|-
!colspan="3" style="background:#ccccff;"| 6 March

|}

Final four
The final four will be held on 14–15 April 2018 at the Főnix Hall in Debrecen.

Awards
Most valuable player: 
Best Goalkeeper:

Semi-finals

Bronze medal match

Final

Final standings

See also
 2017–18 Nemzeti Bajnokság I
 2017–18 Nemzeti Bajnokság I/B
 2017–18 Nemzeti Bajnokság II

References

External links
 Hungarian Handball Federaration 
 hetmeteres.hu

Magyar Kupa Men